Bright Lights, Big City is a novel by American author Jay McInerney, published by Vintage Books on August 12, 1984. It is written about a character's time spent caught up in, and notably escaping from, the mid-1980s New York City fast lane. The novel is written in the second person, an unusual narrative method in English language fiction.

Plot 
The story's narrator is a 24-year-old writer who works as a fact checker for a highbrow magazine for which he had once hoped to write. By night, he is a cocaine-using party-goer seeking to lose himself in the hedonism of the 1980s yuppie party scene, often going to a nightclub called Heartbreak.

His wife, Amanda, recently left him, and he copes with this by pretending nothing happened and telling no one that she is gone. The two had met in Kansas City; the narrator moves with her to New York City, where she begins a modeling career that quickly takes off. After flying out to Paris for Fashion Week, she calls the narrator to inform him that she is leaving him for another man and to pursue her career. Initially hopeful that she will return someday, the narrator eventually resorts to searching for her at a fashion event, publicly humiliating himself while failing to garner more attention from her than a brief look. He obsesses over every item she owned in his apartment, every modeling photo and every club she visited, even repeatedly visiting a mannequin based on her. His partying and his personal troubles begin to affect his work. He eventually comes to realize Amanda's superficiality, becoming both disillusioned with her and the materialistic culture of New York in general. He reveals that the true reason for his spiral downwards was his mother's death, which actually took place a year ago. He realizes that he had married Amanda because he thought it would make his mother happy. After his mother's death, he was in shock and it wasn't until Amanda left him that he began really grieving over his mother, causing his cocaine addiction and reckless abandon.

Adaptations 
McInerney adapted his novel into the screenplay for the film Bright Lights, Big City, released in 1988. In 1999, an off-Broadway stage musical was produced by the New York Theatre Workshop, written by Paul Scott Goodman and directed by Michael Greif, with orchestrations and musical direction by Richard Barone.

References

Further reading

External links
 Bright Lights, Big City

1984 American novels
Novels by Jay McInerney
American novels adapted into films
Novels set in New York City
1984 debut novels
Second-person narrative novels